Israel Delgado Andrés (born 22 January 1979 in Madrid) is a Spanish retired footballer who played as a left back.

External links

Celta de Vigo biography 

1979 births
Living people
Footballers from Madrid
Spanish footballers
Association football defenders
La Liga players
Segunda División players
Segunda División B players
Tercera División players
RSD Alcalá players
CD Guadalajara (Spain) footballers
Celta de Vigo B players
RC Celta de Vigo players
Córdoba CF players
Lorca Deportiva CF footballers
Cultural Leonesa footballers
CD Toledo players
UE Cornellà players